The urban renaissance of the United Kingdom is the recent period of repopulation and regeneration of many British cities, including Birmingham, Bristol, Cardiff, Glasgow, Leeds, Liverpool, Manchester, and parts of London after a period of inner city urban decay and suburbanisation during the mid-20th century. The most common equivalent term used in North America is New Urbanism.

History
Urban regeneration was achieved through a number of initiatives including tax incentives and the lifting of some urban planning restrictions, as well as positive state intervention encouraging business and residents back into city centre areas. Urban renaissance deals with the negative impact of major factors driving change in urban areas such as technical revolution, ecological threat and social transformation. It differs from the New Urbanism popular in North America, but could be considered the British equivalent. Large developments such as the London Docklands project have helped to encourage people back into the city, assisted by gentrification.

Often redundant land, such as 17th and 18th-century canals and docks, railway yards and derelict industrial sites have been the focus of regeneration by agencies such as 'urban renewal companies' and 'regional development agencies'. The most common re-development is mixed use, with flats, townhouse and offices, often with public art and high-quality streetscapes. Derelict but attractive historical buildings have been converted into residential or commercial premises (dubbed "loft apartments" in the US) with generous grants or tax relief.

In the United States, efforts to revitalise urban areas often involve ideas of downtown/city centre as an art and cultural hub or arts district, somewhat akin to Richard Florida's concept of making the urban core friendly to the Creative Class. City leaders may promote events such as First Friday art walks and the construction of convention centers and theatres in order to attract visitors who live in suburbs.

Many American cities have renaissance-themed agency and building. An example is the Renaissance Center and Detroit Renaissance Board in the city of Detroit, Michigan.   Many American cities have seen at least a modest bounce in interest in core cities and older neighborhoods in recent years with a special emphasis on condominium projects, often in formerly non-residential structures.

Criticism
In a 2008 report, the Policy Exchange think tank argued that policies to regenerate struggling cities over the previous ten, twenty, or even fifty years have failed - "we can’t buck economic geography... Places that enjoyed the conditions for creating wealth in the coal-powered 19th-century are often
poorly positioned today. There is no realistic prospect that our regeneration towns and cities can converge with London and the South East. There is, however, a very real prospect of encouraging significant numbers of people to move from those towns to London and the South East." The report was criticised by a number of British politicians.

See also
Towards an Urban Renaissance
 Urban vitality

Notes

External links
 Detroit Renaissance Board   
 City of Rochester New York Renaissance plan
 Google Search for other cities touting an urban renaissance

Urban planning